Ludab Rural District is a rural district (dehestan) in Ludab District, Boyer-Ahmad County, Kohgiluyeh and Boyer-Ahmad Province, Iran. At the 2006 census, its population was 9,392, in 1,864 families. The rural district has 82 villages.

References 

Rural Districts of Kohgiluyeh and Boyer-Ahmad Province
Boyer-Ahmad County